Cheeze may refer to:

Cheeze (band), South Korean band
Cheeze (singer), South Korean singer

See also
Cheez (disambiguation)
Cheese (disambiguation)